Hugh Gore may refer to:

 Hugh Gore (cricketer)
 Hugh Gore (bishop)